Mohamed ben Zamoum (born in Boghni on 1795 and died also in Boghni on 1843) was a Kabyle marabout who participated in the Algerian resistance against the French conquest of Algeria.

Family
Mohamed ben Zamoum was born during the year 1795 in the region of Boghni into the Kabyle Iflissen Umellil confederacy, whom historically served as troops under the Deylik of Algiers.

He is part of the noble family of Ben Zamoum who reigned over the tribe of Flissas as part of the kingdom of Koukou.

Mohamed had several children, the best known of which are Hocine ben Zamoum and Omar ben Zamoum who succeeded him in 1848 in command of the Flissas tribe.

His grandson Ali ben Zamoum also played a major role in the Kabyle resistance against French troupes coloniales, from 1844 to 1848.

French conquest of Algeria

He served in the Deylik's army during the Invasion of Algiers in 1830 against France, and he commanded the Zwawa forces during the invasion. Several of his family members died in battle against the French army.

Just after the surrender of Dey Hussein on 5 July 1830 and the capitulation of the Casbah of Algiers, Sheikh Mohamed ben Zamoum organized with the marabouts of Kabylia and Mitidja a meeting of the heads of the zawiyas in the Bordj Tamentfoust on 26 July.

This meeting, which began on 23 July and ended on 26 July, decided on the option of resistance to the French presence in an energetic movement of the tribes whose leaders, like Mohamed ben Zamoum, joined their forces and mobilized themselves in the popular response after the fall of Algiers.

This meeting occurred when General Victor de Bourmont did not follow the advice of Mohamed ben Zamoum in the letter he had addressed to him to dissuade him from initiating a military expedition of the First Battle of Blida.

The Sheikh wanted to urge the French to refrain from advancing into the country in the suburbs of Algiers, at least until a treaty was signed which would regulate the nature of relations between the French occupiers and the Algerian nationals.

But de Bourmont did not want to follow the advice of the Sheikh, and he began his campaign against Blida on 23 July after having contracted a connivance with the bey of Titteri in Médéa, the named Mustapha Boumezrag.

The defeat of the 1,200 infantry, 100 cavalry, and artillery pieces on which General de Bourmont had based in his expedition against Blida and its surroundings, had convinced Sheikh ben Zamoum that resistance against the French was possible and that the combat would settle the positions of the belligerents.

Allegiance to Ben Zamoum
The tribes of Mitidja and Kabylia then signed a treaty of allegiance to Sheikh ben Zamoum dated 26 July 1830, where he was proclaimed leader of the popular resistance against the forces of the French Army.

Thus, from 2 September 1830, the Sheikh stepped up his raids against the French forces commanded by the new arriving General Bertrand Clauzel, who had been appointed commander-in-chief of the expedition army to replace de Bourmont.

Second Battle of Blida

When on 18 November 1830, a second column of 7,000 French soldiers invaded the town of Blida, they found it almost deserted because most of the population had fled to the mountain of Chréa on the injunction of Sheikh ben Zamoum.

But while the column of Colonel Rulhière was marching on Médéa after taking possession of Blida, the Sheikh sent a contingent of Kabyles from the Flissas tribe under the leadership of his son Hocine ben Zamoum to hook the French in Mitidja.

Having learned of the occupation of Blida by the French soldiers, Hocine ben Zamoum called on Kabyle reinforcements from the Khachna, the Col des Beni Aïcha, the Beni Moussa and the Beni Misra to march against the city of Blida in order to liberate it.

Resistance of Kabylia

Sheikh Mohamed Ben Zamoum was allied with Emir Abdelkader in the year 1837, and he undertook with his Emirate of Abdelkader the operation of building a viable Algerian state which would include the former territory of the kingdom of Koukou, and this especially after the signing of the Tafna treaty on May 30 of the same year.

During the seven years which would follow the alliance between Kabylia and the state of Abdelkader until 1843, dozens of battles pitted the faithful of Sheikh ben Zamoum against French troops in the mountains and plains to the east from Algiers.

It was Emir Mustapha who then began the great offensive against the French colonists of Mitidja during the First Raid on Reghaïa on 8 May 1837, and this is how the Col des Beni Aïcha and the plain of the Issers were then set ablaze to the confines of the city Dellys.

Death
Mohamed ben Zamoum died during the year 1843 in the region of Boghni in Kabylia at the age of 48 after thirteen years of resistance against the French conquest of Algeria.

Gallery

See also

 French conquest of Algeria
 Ottoman Algeria
 Invasion of Algiers in 1830
 First Battle of Blida (1830)
 Raid on Reghaïa (1837)
 Expedition of the Col des Beni Aïcha (1837)
 First Battle of Boudouaou (1837)
 First Battle of the Issers (1837)
 First Assault of Dellys (1837)

External links

References

1795 births
Algerian people
People from Naciria
People from Naciria District
People from Boumerdès Province
Kabyle people
1843 deaths
Deaths in Algeria
French Algeria
1830s in Algeria